Daniel Udsen (born 2 September 1983 ) is a former Faroese footballer of Danish descent, whose primary position was in midfield.

Club career
Udsen has previously played for Hvidovre IF and Albertslund IF in Denmark. During his stay at Albertslund he was in the team that won the official Danish Indoor Football championship, after a 5–4 victory in the final against Hellerup IK, at the Aarup Sports Centre in January 2005.

In the summer of 2005, he signed for Greve Fodbold, who were then playing in the Denmark Series. He debuted for the first team in August 2005 against Farum BK (consisting of the FC Nordsjælland reserves) and also scored on his debut. In his first season at the club in the 2005–06 season, he scored 9 goals and helped the team win promotion to the Danish 2nd Division when Greve Football won the Denmark Series Pool 1. In the 2006/07 season, he made 25 appearances and scored 6 goals. During the summer in 2007, he signed a one-year contract with second division club Fremad Amager. Udsen made his first team debut in the second division east match, against local rivals B 1908 at the Sundby Sports Park on 5 August 2007.

On 13 December 2011 he signed a contract with Danish club Elite 3000 Helsingør.

International career
On 3 September 2010, he made his international debut with the Faroe Islands national football team in a Euro 2012 qualifying match against Serbia and was substituted at half-time for Christian Mouritsen.

Honours
Greve Fodbold
 Winner of Denmark Series 2005/06

EB/Streymur
 Faroe Islands Cup: 2010 and 2011

References

Daniel Udsen stopper i FC Helsingør, fchelsingor.dk, 16 June 2015

Living people
Faroese people of Danish descent
Faroese footballers
EB/Streymur players
Hvidovre IF players
1983 births
Vanløse IF players
FC Vestsjælland players
Fremad Amager players
FC Helsingør players
Association football midfielders
Faroe Islands international footballers
People from Albertslund Municipality
Sportspeople from the Capital Region of Denmark